Once in a While is an album by American pop singer Johnny Mathis that was released on May 23, 1988, by Columbia Records and found him returning to the practice of covering contemporary hits but also mixing in lesser-known songs already recorded by other artists along with a few new ones ("Daydreamin'", "From a Whisper to a Scream", "Two Strong Hearts").

Although the album did not make it onto Billboard magazine's  Top Pop Albums chart, the song "I'm on the Outside Looking In" did reach number 27 during its 12 weeks on the magazine's list of the 40 Hot Adult Contemporary songs of the week in the US that began in the issue dated July 2 of that year.

Reception

The album received a positive retrospective review from Allmusic, where Bil Carpenter praised the "outstanding street corner-style singing" on the title track and "I'm on the Outside Looking In" and also had kind words for "From a Whisper to a Scream" and "Two Strong Hearts".

Track listing

 "I'm on the Outside Looking In" (Teddy Randazzo, Bobby Weinstein) – 3:24
 "It Wouldn't Have Made Any Difference" (Todd Rundgren) – 4:01
 "Two Strong Hearts"  performed with Dionne Warwick  (Andy Hill, Bruce Woolley) – 4:00
 "Once in a While" (Michael Edwards, Bud Green) – 3:28
 "Fallen" (Lauren Wood) – 3:33
 "Daydreamin'" (Noel Closson, Preston Glass, Larry Graham) – 4:30
 "From a Whisper to a Scream" (Steven Birch, Glass) – 4:25
 "Ain't No Woman (Like the One I've Got)" (Dennis Lambert, Brian Potter) – 4:08
 "Just Like You" (Jeff Pescetto) – 3:50
 "Love Brought Us Here Tonight" (Stephen Geyer, Allan Rich, Smokey Robinson) – 4:04

Recording dates
From the liner notes for The Voice of Romance: The Columbia Original Album Collection:
December 6, 1987 – "Ain't No Woman (Like the One I've Got)", "Daydreamin'", "From a Whisper to a Scream", "Two Strong Hearts"
December 1987–March 1988 – "Fallen", "I'm on the Outside Looking In", "It Wouldn't Have Made Any Difference", "Just Like You", "Love Brought Us Here Tonight", "Once in a While"

Song information
Tommy Dorsey & His Orchestra spent seven weeks at number one in Billboard magazine in 1937 with "Once in a While", which is the oldest of the songs Mathis covers this time around. "I'm on the Outside Looking In" by Little Anthony and the Imperials reached number 15 on the Billboard Hot 100 and number eight on the magazine's Hot R&B singles chart in 1964. And the recording of "Ain't No Woman (Like the One I've Got)" by The Four Tops earned Gold certification from the Recording Industry Association of America and peaked at number two R&B, number four pop, and number 14 on the magazine's list of the 40 most popular Easy Listening songs of the week in the US in 1973.

Todd Rundgren's "It Wouldn't Have Made Any Difference" first appeared on his 1972 album Something/Anything?, and "Just Like You" was recorded by Dennis Edwards for his 1984 LP Don't Look Any Further. Smokey Robinson included "Love Brought Us Here Tonight" on his 1987 album One Heartbeat, and Lauren Wood's original recording of "Fallen" appeared on her 1981 release Cat Trick but received its widest exposure as one of the songs heard in the 1990 film Pretty Woman and on its soundtrack album, which was released two years after this album and sold 3 million copies. The duet on this album, "Two Strong Hearts" (with Dionne Warwick), was also released as a solo outing in 1988 by John Farnham on his Age of Reason album; his version got as high as number 38 on Billboard magazine's Adult Contemporary chart and number five in Australia.

Personnel
From the liner notes for the original album:

Johnny Mathis – vocals
Jay Landers – executive producer
Bobby Yosten, Toluca Lake – wardrobe
Lore Patterson – styling
Nancy Donald – design
Tony Lane – design
David Vance – photographer
Mastered at Bernie Grundman Mastering, Hollywood, California
Mixed at Conway Studios, Hollywood, California, using the GML Automation System

Tracks 1-5
Peter Bunetta – producer; drums
Rick Chudacoff – producer; bass
Bill Elliott – keyboards
Paulinho da Costa – percussion
Dann Huff – guitar (except "Once in a While")
Leslie Smith – background vocals
David Woodford – soprano sax ("Fallen")
Michael Thompson – guitar ("It Wouldn't Have Made Any Difference", "Once in a While")
Fred Tackett – acoustic guitar ("It Wouldn't Have Made Any Difference", "Once in a While")
Melvin Franklin – background vocals ("Once in a While")
Kipper Jones – background vocals ("Once in a While")
Roderick White – background vocals ("Once in a While")
Fred White – background vocals ("Once in a While")
Ricky Nelson – background vocals ("Once in a While")
Lynne Fiddmont – background vocals ("Two Strong Hearts")
Syreeta – background vocals ("Two Strong Hearts")
Recorded and mixed at Conway Studios, Hollywood, California
Daren Klein – recording engineer
Additional recording at Lion Share Studios, Los Angeles, California
Frank Wolf – additional recording engineer
Gary Wagner – additional recording engineer
Tom Vicari – additional recording engineer
Mick Guzauski – mixing engineer
Marnie Riley – assistant engineer
Bryant Arnett – assistant engineer
Karen Siegel – assistant engineer
Ray Pyle – assistant engineer

Tracks 6-8
Preston Glass – producer; arranger; keyboards; drum and percussion programming
Frankie Blue – background vocals
Joe Ericksen – background vocals
DeVere Duckett – background vocals
Craig Thomas – sax solo ("Ain't No Woman (Like the One I've Got)"); background vocals
Jorge Bermudez – live percussion, Bermudez Triangle ("From a Whisper to a Scream")
Jim Studer – acoustic piano solo ("Daydreamin'")
Recorded at Studio Ultimo, West Hollywood, California
Mixed at  One on One Studios, North Hollywood, Los Angeles, California
Maureen Droney – recording engineer, mixing engineer
Mitch Zelezny – assistant engineer
Bernard Frings – assistant engineer

Tracks 9-10
Robert Kraft – producer; piano; synthesizers; additional percussion ("Love Brought Us Here Tonight")
Tom Walsh – drums
Neil Stubenhaus – bass
Nick Brown – guitar
Jorge Bermudez – percussion
Michael Paulo – saxophone
Darryl Phinnessee – background vocals
Dorian Holley – background vocals
Sheryl Crow – background vocals
Lynn David – background vocals
Greg Bartheld – additional synth programming
David Benson – project coordination/technical director
Recorded in Los Angeles at Ocean Way Studios, The Five Spot, Ignited Studios, Kren Studios
Ed Thacker – engineer; mixing engineer ("Just Like You")
"Just Like You" mixed at The Grey Room, Hollywood, California 
Daren Klein – mixing engineer ("Love Brought Us Here Tonight")
"Love Brought Us Here Tonight" mixed at Ocean Way Studios, Hollywood, California

References

Bibliography

 

1988 albums
Johnny Mathis albums
Columbia Records albums
Albums recorded at United Western Recorders